Yukiko Yamashita (born 1971) is an American developmental biologist. She joined the Whitehead Institute in September 2020 and has been appointed a Professor of Biology at Massachusetts Institute of Technology (MIT). She is the inaugural incumbent of the Susan Lindquist Chair for Women in Science at Whitehead Institute. She was previously a faculty member of the University of Michigan Life Sciences Institute and a professor in the Department of Cell and Developmental Biology at the University of Michigan Medical School. She was appointed an HHMI Investigator in 2013. In November 2013 she received a 5-year appointment as the James Playfair McMurrich Collegiate Professor of the Life Sciences at the University of Michigan Medical School. Her current research at the Whitehead Institute and MIT focuses on germline immortality is maintained by germline stem cell behavior .

She received a Tsuneko & Reiji Okazaki Award in 2016, a Keck Foundation Award in 2012. She is a 2011 MacArthur Fellow and a 2008 Searle Scholar.

Life
She graduated from Kyoto University with a BS and PhD in Biophysics, and was a postdoctoral fellow with Margaret T. Fuller at Stanford University from 2001 to 2006.

References

External links
http://f1000.com/thefaculty/member/1648248123131491

21st-century American biologists
Stem cell researchers
University of Michigan faculty
Living people
Japanese expatriates in the United States
1972 births
MacArthur Fellows
Howard Hughes Medical Investigators